Kevin Marcus Ellison (January 8, 1987 – October 4, 2018) was an American football safety in the National Football League (NFL). He was drafted by the San Diego Chargers in the sixth round of the 2009 NFL Draft. He played college football at Southern California.

Early years
Born in Inglewood, California, United States, Ellison attended Redondo Union High School, where he starred as a running back and linebacker. He achieved many honors and awards including Los Angeles Times All-South Bay/Westside Player of the Year, South Bay Daily Breeze All-Area Player of the Year, and All-Bay League MVP. He finished his high school career with a record 3,718 rushing yards on 578 carries and 297 tackles.

College career
Ellison graduated a semester early from high school and enrolled at USC in the spring of 2005 to pursue a social science economics degree. During his freshman season he spent most of his time as a back up safety and on special teams, and was selected to The Sporting News Pac-10 All-Freshman first-team. In 2006, he became the team's starting strong safety, finishing with 64 tackles, one interception, and 1.5 sacks. He made the 2006 Collegefootballnews.com Sophomore All-American second-team and was an All-Pac-10 honorable mention. In 2007 Ellison started all 13 games, finishing with 57 tackles, two interceptions, and two sacks.

Professional career

San Diego Chargers
Ellison was drafted by the San Diego Chargers in the sixth round of the 2009 NFL Draft.  He started his first NFL game in week 6 against the Denver Broncos and recorded 7 tackles.  He was waived on June 21, 2010.

Seattle Seahawks
On June 22, 2010 Ellison was claimed off waivers by the Seattle Seahawks. He was waived on June 25, 2010 after failing his physical. He then cleared waivers and signed in order to "adjust contractual issues." Once again, he was united with his college coach.  On September 5, 2010, Ellison was released by the Seahawks.

Cathedral High School (Los Angeles, CA)
September 2011: Kevin Ellison became the Defensive Coordinator at Cathedral High School in Los Angeles, CA and was joined by his brothers, Keith who coaches the Linebackers and Chris who coaches the Defensive Backs.

Personal
Ellison's brother, Keith, was a linebacker for the Buffalo Bills. Another brother, Chris, played for BYU in 1997 and 1998.

On May 24, 2010, Ellison was arrested on possession of a controlled substance in Redondo Beach, California after a bottle of unprescribed vicodin pills that he was taking for a recent knee injury was discovered in his car during a routine traffic stop; the charges were later dropped.

On June 14, 2012, Ellison was arrested again, this time for arson after starting an apartment fire in Liberty Lake, Washington which caused an estimated $50,000 worth of damage to the building. He claimed God told him to do it.

Ellison died in October 2018 at the age of 31. He had been walking on the Interstate 5 freeway when he was fatally struck.

In September of 2019, researchers at Boston University posthumously determined that Ellison had Stage II chronic traumatic encephalopathy from studying tissue samples of his brain.

References

External links
USC Trojans football bio

1987 births
2018 deaths
Players of American football from Inglewood, California
American football safeties
USC Trojans football players
San Diego Chargers players
Seattle Seahawks players
Spokane Shock players
Road incident deaths in California
Pedestrian road incident deaths